Botlog Island is an island and barangay in northeastern Iloilo, Philippines. It is part of the municipality of Concepcion. According to the 2010 census, it has a population of 441.

Location and geography 
Botlog Island is east of Panay Island in the Visayan Sea. Part of the Concepcion Islands, Botlog is in between Igbon Island and Pan de Azucar Island. Its sole barangay is Botlog.

Natural disasters

Typhoon Haiyan 
Typhoon Haiyan (locally known as Yolanda) passed over Botlog Island in 2013, damaging boats and homes. The VICTO National region 6 office helped in relief efforts, distributing emergency food rations.

See also 

 List of islands in the Philippines

References

External links
 Botlog Island at OpenStreetMap

Islands of Iloilo
Barangays of Iloilo